USS Gladiator may refer to:

 , a tugboat, built 1876, in service briefly with the U.S. Navy in 1918
 , a U.S. Navy minesweeper commissioned 1944, active during World War II, decommissioned 1955
 , an Avenger-class mine countermeasures ship of the U.S. Navy, commissioned 1993

United States Navy ship names